Huang Mandan (born 15 March 1984) is a former Chinese gymnast.

Gymnastics career

1999
Huang participated in the 1999 World Championships in Tianjin, China, where she won bronze with her team. She qualified to the individual all-around, where she placed 6th. Her low start values on vault greatly contributed to her placing out of the medals. She ended her world championships with a silver medal on uneven bars, behind Svetlana Khorkina and in front of teammate Ling Jie.

2000 Olympic Games
In the 2000 Olympics, she placed in qualification of uneven bars, but did not advance to the final because of the two per country rule. Her teammates Ling Jie and Yang Yun qualified into the bar finals in 2nd and 4th, where they finished 2nd and 3rd respectively. She was also a member of the bronze medal winning team, but the medal was stripped by the IOC in 2010 after one of the Chinese team members, Dong Fangxiao was found to be underage during the competition. In March 2012, the 1999 World Championship Team Bronze was forfeited by China and given to Ukraine in light of the same information.

Huang retired in December 2001 and became a gymnastics coach after graduating from Jinan University in China.

References

1999 World Artistic Gymnastics Championships

1983 births
Living people
Chinese female artistic gymnasts
Gymnasts at the 2000 Summer Olympics
Olympic gymnasts of China
Medalists at the World Artistic Gymnastics Championships
Competitors stripped of Summer Olympics medals
Gymnasts from Guangdong
People from Shanwei
Jinan University
21st-century Chinese women